General elections were held in the Cook Islands in January 1989 to elect 24 MPs to the Parliament.  The elections saw the Cook Islands Party win 12 seats, the Democratic Tumu Party win 2 seats, and the Democratic Party-led opposition coalition win 9 seats.  One seat was won by an independent. Following the elections, the Democratic Tumu Party supported the CIP, and Geoffrey Henry became Prime Minister for the second time.

Results

References

Elections in the Cook Islands
Cook Islands
1989 in the Cook Islands
Cook
Election and referendum articles with incomplete results